Dixie Longate is the drag persona of American actor, writer, comedian, and drag performer Kris Andersson who since 2007 has been performing a solo act called Dixie's Tupperware Party in five countries while engaging with her audience to sell actual Tupperware products.

Andersson's role as "Dixie" began as a dare in 2004 from a friend to sell Tupperware while in drag. Andersson accepted the challenge, and went on to become Tupperware's number 1 sales representative in both the United States and Canada while developing the show.  In 2007 Andersson participated in a 3-month residency at New York's Ars Nova theater to further develop his work and his character, and in 2008 was nominated for a Drama Desk Award for Outstanding Solo Performance.

Andersson also has appeared on TV series and films such as Hellbent in 2004 as 'White Pepper'.

Filmography

Film

Television

References

External links

Living people
1970 births
American drag queens
21st-century LGBT people